The following are the telephone codes in Mozambique.

Calling formats
 yy xxxxxx or yyy xxxxx - Calls inside Mozambique
 +258 yyy xxxxx or +258 yy xxxxxx or +258 yyy xxxxxx - Calls from outside Mozambique
The NSN length is 8 or 9 digits.

List of area codes in Mozambique

List of Mobile Numbers in Mozambique

References

Mozambique
Telecommunications in Mozambique
Telephone numbers